Rhododendron lanatum (syn. Rhododendron flinckii), the woolly rhododendron, is a species of flowering plant in the family Ericaceae, native to the eastern Himalayas and southeastern Tibet. Occasionally found in commerce, it is a rabbit-tolerant evergreen shrub reaching . Hardy in USDA zones 7 through 9, it is recommended as a hedge in partly shady situations. 

Its young shoots and leaves are covered with a white to tawny velvety wool, giving it its scientific and common names. May flowers are typically sulphur-yellow with maroon-spotted throats, and there is a cream-flowered morph.

References

lanatum
Flora of Tibet
Flora of East Himalaya
Plants described in 1851